Gonzalo de los Santos da Rosa (born 19 July 1976) is a Uruguayan retired footballer who played as a defensive midfielder, and is a manager.

He spent the vast majority of his professional career in Spain, playing 280 competitive matches for six teams over 11 seasons – 179 in La Liga alone, being crowned champion with Valencia – but started and finished it at the same club, Peñarol.

De los Santos won 33 caps for Uruguay, and represented the nation at the 2002 World Cup.

Club career
De los Santos was born in Salto. After winning three consecutive Primera División titles with Peñarol he moved to Spain, where he represented CP Mérida, Málaga CF (achieving La Liga promotion in 1999), Valencia CF – appearing in 13 matches for the 2002 league champions – Atlético Madrid and RCD Mallorca; at the latter club, he reunited with former Valencia teammate Jorge López, who had also been loaned shortly before.

For the 2006–07 campaign, after having spent one year in the sidelines, de los Santos joined Segunda División side Hércules CF. After two seasons where he was relatively used, he returned to Peñarol on 29 July 2008, retiring from football two years later at the age of 34.

International career
A Uruguayan international for nine years, de los Santos was selected for the squad that appeared in the 2002 FIFA World Cup, featuring 20 minutes in the 0–0 group stage draw against France. He also represented the nation at the 1997 FIFA Confederations Cup in Saudi Arabia, playing four games in an eventual fourth-place finish.

References

External links
Stats at Liga de Fútbol Profesional 

National team data 

1976 births
Living people
Footballers from Salto, Uruguay
Uruguayan footballers
Association football midfielders
Uruguayan Primera División players
Peñarol players
La Liga players
Segunda División players
CP Mérida footballers
Málaga CF players
Valencia CF players
Atlético Madrid footballers
RCD Mallorca players
Hércules CF players
Uruguay international footballers
1997 Copa América players
1997 FIFA Confederations Cup players
2002 FIFA World Cup players
Uruguayan expatriate footballers
Expatriate footballers in Spain
Uruguayan expatriate sportspeople in Spain
Uruguayan football managers